Nicholas Wood (1832 – 24 December 1892) was a British industrialist and Conservative Party politician.

He was born in Killingworth, Northumberland, where his father, also Nicholas Wood, was a locomotive engineer. The family subsequently moved to Hetton-le-Hole, County Durham, where they took part in developing the coalfields. Educated at Repton School, he went on to be the proprietor of a number of mines in the Hetton area, as well as having interests in shipping and other industries. In 1881 he married Edith Florence Jervis of Staffordshire. He was a justice of the peace and deputy lieutenant of County Durham.

He was elected as the Member of Parliament (MP) for Houghton-le-Spring at the 1886 general election, having contested the seat unsuccessfully in 1885. He was defeated at the 1892 general election. He was believed to have been defeated by the votes of local miners who had been engaged in a lengthy strike and of Irish immigrants due to his opposition to Home Rule. He died from typhoid fever later that year in Half Moon Street, Piccadilly, London, aged 60. He was buried in the churchyard at Saltwood near Hythe, Kent on 29 December.

References

External links 
 

1832 births
1892 deaths
British mining businesspeople
Conservative Party (UK) MPs for English constituencies
Deaths from typhoid fever
Deputy Lieutenants of Durham
People educated at Repton School
People from the Metropolitan Borough of North Tyneside
Politicians from Tyne and Wear
UK MPs 1886–1892
19th-century English businesspeople